Turkeytown may refer to:

Turkeytown (Cherokee town), a Native American settlement in what is now Tennessee
Turkeytown, Kentucky, an unincorporated community in Lincoln County
Turkeytown, Pennsylvania, a village in Westmoreland County

See also
Treaty of Turkeytown, 14 September 1816